The 2022 Hula Bowl was a postseason college football all-star game played on January 15, 2022, with kickoff at 12:00 noon EST, at the Bounce House in Orlando, Florida. It was the first all-star contest of the 2021–22 bowl games and, while not restricted to FBS players, one of the final games of the 2021 FBS football season. Television coverage was provided by CBS Sports Network. This was the first playing of the Hula Bowl outside of Hawaii, due to Aloha Stadium near Honolulu being closed for renovations. The game rostered players into Aina and Kai teams, the words for land and sea in the Hawaiian language.

Coaches

Team Aina was led by Mike Smith, former head coach of the Atlanta Falcons, while Team Kai will be led by Brian Billick, former head coach of the Baltimore Ravens. Complete coaching staffs were announced as follows:

Game
Player invitations were determined by the Hula Bowl Selection Committee led by directors of Scouting, Damond Talbot, Scott Phillips Jr, and Jimmy Williams, primarily based on "potential to make a professional Football team roster". Team Kai wore blue uniforms and Team Aina wore black uniforms.

Game summary

See also
 2022 NFL Draft

References

External links
 
 2022 Hula Bowl All Star Game Highlights via YouTube

Hula Bowl
American football in Florida
Hula Bowl
Hula Bowl
American football in Orlando, Florida